Ondangwa (earlier spelling Ondangua) is a town in the Oshana Region of northern Namibia, bordering the Oshikoto Region. Ondangwa was first established as a mission station of the Finnish Missionary Society (the FMS) in 1890. In 1914, it became a local seat of government.

Ondangwa is said to mean the end of the Ondonga area. (Ondonga is one of the kingdoms of Ovamboland), and Ondangwa is located on the western edge of this kingdom.

It is one of the places of residence of the Kings of Ondonga; the current King Eliphas Kauluma, father to the reigning king, lives here. Most of the residents of the town speak Oshindonga.

Ondangwa is the district capital of the Ondangwa electoral constituency.

Economy and infrastructure 
Ondangwa features various shopping centre, a large open market, and several tourism facilities. There are also shopping centres such as Gwashamba mall, Yetu complex, Ondangwa Industrial Park, Time Square Mall, Sun Square mall, Andimba Toivo yaToivo Complex, Three Sisters Mall and others. Many local authorities for the Oshana and Oshikoto regions are seated in the town, e.g. the Ministry of Education and Police. Onandjokwe State Hospital is situated nearby.

There are several schools in the town, among them Andimba Toivo ya Toivo Senior Secondary School. Some schools extend far from the town - for instance Ekulo Senior Secondary School.In terms of education, there are many schools in Ondangwa such as Heroes Private School, Nangolo Secondary School, Iihenda Secondary School and Ondangwa Secondary School. There are also primary schools such as Olukolo Primary School and Ondangwa Prof-Private School and many other. Apart from schools that offer full time classes, there are also schools which offer part time classes to learners who want to improve their grade 10 and 12 results. These are schools such as Elite and NAMCOL. NAMCOL centre also offers other programmes such as ICDL which trains students on how to use computers and other ICT skills. The most well-known football team is KK Palace and Volcano.

Since independence, the government has settled up an industry in the north, to create jobs and improve the poor infrastructure. Rössing Foundation, Kayec and Cosdec are the three vocational skills schools training young people in building maintenance, sewing, cooking, and Internet Technology.

Safland Namibia is  developing a multimillion-dollar shopping mall in Ondangwa.

Transport 

In 2001, planning started on a railway line to link Tsumeb with Ondangwa, with extensions to Angola planned to follow. The rail line had its first official service on 11 May 2006. The passenger train Omugulugwombashe Star traveled once a week back and forth between Windhoek and Ondangwa before it broke down due to climatic conditions.

Ondangwa Airport is linked to Oshakati and Oshikango by a tarred road. Rental car services are available to tourists. There is Ekamuti Lodge, Ondangwa Town Lodge, Protea Hotel, Oshoto Pension Hotel, Anot Guest House, Ondangwa Restcamp and many others. All these places can give accommodation in Ondangwa Residents and car drivers are extra cautious when crossing and driving in town, because livestock permission in town is not strictly regulated by the authorities. As a result, cattle and many goats roam around streets, especially at night.

Geography
Ondangwa is situated amidst the dramatic scenery of the Kaoko and Damara regions, in the vicinity of Etosha National Park. The relatively pristine state of much of the local culture in the surrounding areas is balanced by the bustling markets and vibrant urban life of the town centre. For visitors, Ondangwa town has a variety of accommodation options, from camp sites to a range of hotels. Informal markets sell a variety of products including traditional clothes and local street food such as dried caterpillars and meat dishes.

Climate
Ondangwa has a semi-arid climate (BSh, according to the Köppen climate classification), with hot summers and warm winters (with mild days and cool nights).

Politics and Government
Ondangwa is governed by a town council that has seven seats. Current challenges faced include the growing demand for housing due to rapid urbanisation, as well unemployment. TIPEEG, a government project to create jobs, is intended to assist in curbing unemployment in the town. The council has produced a development plan with guiding documents in the hope of facilitating investment. In order to combat the shortage of housing, the council has entered into a private-public partnership with Namibou, for the intended construction of roughly a thousand houses. It has also declared the aim of making the local government "an engine for sustainable development" in the region, and joined ICLEI in 2013.

Oshana Region, to which Ondangwa belongs, is a stronghold of Namibia's ruling SWAPO party. In the 2015 local authority election SWAPO won by a landslide (2,582 votes) and gained six council seats. The remaining seat went to the Democratic Turnhalle Alliance (DTA) which gained 158 votes. SWAPO also won the 2020 local authority election. It obtained 1923 votes and gained four seats. The Independent Patriots for Change (IPC), an opposition party formed in August 2020, obtained 1,744 votes and gained three seats.

History

Finnish mission station
The Ondangwa mission station was founded by August Pettinen in 1890. At that time it was said that the distance was equal to two hours of travel on an ox cart.

Before Ondangwa was founded, the Finns had experienced a string of setbacks in the territories of other Ovambo tribes, i.e. in the kingdoms of Uukwambi, Ongadjera in the west and Oukwanyama in the north, and circumstances dictated that their work had to be concentrated in Ondonga. Even in Ondonga, the Finns could only work in the west, because in eastern Ondonga, Prince Nehale had been acting in an erratic and despotic way and thus made it impossible for foreigners to work or even survive there.

In August 1889 the Finns received news that Nehale was planning to kill them and to plunder the mission stations in his realm. The reason for this was that Nehale thought, incorrectly, that the Finns would have much ammunition that he could acquire. Pettinen had brought with him a couple of Christian families, and some of his servants were also Christians, so a small congregation existed in Ondangwa right from the beginning.

In 1898 the FMS sent Hilja Lindberg and Anna Rautanen, daughter of Martti Rautanen, to Ovamboland and Ondangwa. They were the first unmarried female missionaries in Ovamboland. Both had been given a chance to practice healthcare work at the Helsinki Deaconess Institute, as the plan was that they would be engaged in this line of work in Ovamboland. Lindberg was also going to teach Ovambo women how to spin and weave cotton.

However, the cultivation and processing of cotton turned out to require too much labour and water, and the results were not in a reasonable proportion compared with the amount of work required. Furthermore, the Ovambos were used to getting material from the Finns and were not motivated to produce their own material. This experiment thus had to be abandoned.

In 1900 the director of the FMS, Jooseppi Mustakallio, came to Ovamboland to inspect the mission field. One of the sites inspected was Ondangwa. He was in general happy with what he saw there.

When August Hänninen arrived in Ovamboland in 1904, Ondangwa became for a short time the most important place of health care there. Hänninen was not trained for medicare work, but as a conscript in the army he had worked as a surgeon’s assistant, or some kind of a paramedic, and he was eager to continue in this line of work in Ovamboland. Indeed, he soon became known as a famous healer. August Pettinen reported that in 1905, when many kinds of epidemics ravaged Ovamboland, some 7,000 visits by patients had been made in Ondangwa. Even the following year there were 3,700 visits by patients. It appears that sometime after this Hänninen moved to Oniipa, where he used 4–5 hours daily for taking care of patients.

Armed conflict in Ondangwa
In February 1906, there was an armed conflict in the immediate vicinity of the Ondangwa mission station. The battle was connected to an attempted coup on Ondonga. The nephews of King Kambonde, Albin and Martin had been baptised and were next in line for the throne. Their aunt, Kambonde’s sister Amutaleni incited them to kill the king. Even before this, the brothers had started to sort out things in Kambonde’s realm, without the consent of Kambonde. When Albin decided that he would not continue to act against the king, his brother Martin assassinated him. This led into an armed conflict between the supporters of these two brothers. Circa 40 Ondonga men were killed in this conflict, and as a result of the affair, two other brothers, also in line for the throne, had to go into exile.

It seems that most people in Ondangwa lost their fortunes in this conflict, since in 1908 it was reported that the people in Ondangwa could not support their parish in any way whatsoever.

Administrative outpost
In early 1914 the Finns had abandoned the Ondangwa mission station. When the British took over South West Africa during World War I, they also came to Ovamboland and in 1915 chose Ondangwa as the location of their administration. On Christmas Day that year they hoisted the Union Jack in Ondangwa for the first time. The commander of the English was Major C. N. Manning, whose title was the Resident Commissioner.

In October 1915 Lieutenant C. H. L. Hahn arrived in Ovamboland. He was the grandson of Carl Hugo Hahn, raised by the son of the latter, Pastor Carl Hugo Hahn Jr., in Paarl, Cape Province. He worked in Ovamboland as the highest administrator for 30 years and had a great influence on the relations between the Finnish missionaries and the colonial administration.

The official status of the government station in Ondangwa was not sorted out until several years later, when in 1921 the government finally bought it from the Finns.

In 1945, towards the end of World War II, the South African government sent an Organizer of Native Education to Northern Namibia, to oversee school work in Ovamboland and Kavango. The first such organizer was D. R. Rootman, who was based in Ondangwa. Later this moved to Grootfontein, and the organizer visited Ovamboland once a year.

During Apartheid 
Due to its strategic airport, Ondangwa became an important staging area for the South African Defence Force during its campaigns in neighbouring Angola. Local road and rail links were also improved by authorities to facilitate the rapid movement of military vehicles. While prior to 1970 the highway was unpaved beyond Otjiwarongo, by the end of the decade the tarmac extended through Ondangwa to Oshakati.

As the Namibian War of Independence intensified, Ondangwa became a target for the South West African People's Organization until South Africa's withdrawal from the region in 1990.

Notable residents
Eddie Amkongo
Angelina Immanuel

See also 
Transport in Namibia
Railway stations in Namibia

References

Notes

Literature

External links 
Maplandia Map
Ondangwa

Populated places in the Oshana Region
Towns in Namibia
Finnish Evangelical Lutheran Mission mission stations in Ondonga
Populated places established in 1890
1890 establishments in Africa